The thick-billed lark (Ramphocoris clotbey) or Clotbey lark is a species of lark in the family Alaudidae.

Taxonomy and systematics
It was named after Antoine Clot. It was originally described as belonging to the genus Melanocorypha and is now placed in the monotypic genus Ramphocoris.

Distribution and habitat
It is found in northern Africa from Mauritania and Morocco to Libya, also in central regions of the Arabian Peninsula. Its natural habitats are subtropical or tropical dry shrubland and hot deserts.

Gallery

References

thick-billed lark
Birds of North Africa
Birds of the Middle East
thick-billed lark
thick-billed lark
Articles containing video clips
Taxonomy articles created by Polbot